The Aresh uezd was a county (uezd) of the Elizavetpol Governorate of the Russian Empire and later of the Azerbaijan Democratic Republic with its center in Aresh (present-day Agdash) from 1874 until its formal abolition in 1929 by Soviet authorities.

Geography
The Aresh uezd was located in the northeastern section of Elizavetpol Governorate, on the eastern bank of the Kura River, bordering the Baku Governorate to the east, the Nukha uezd to the north, the Elizavetpol uezd to the northwest and Jebrail uezd to the southwest. The area of the uezd was 2822.9 square verst. The territory of the county was mainly made up of lowlands. The county capital was initially in Uchkovakh, later being moved to Agdash, which was considered the largest cotton-trading center in the lowlands of Transcaucasia.

History
The territory of Aresh uezd was located in the Turyanchay River basin. The area was called Aresh in the Middle Ages and formed a part of Shirvan Baylarbaylik which was gradually made significantly weaker after repeated Ottoman-Safavid conflicts on its territory, eventually being subdued into the Shaki Khanate in the 1750s. 

After the establishment of Russian rule, Aresh was a part of Nukha uezd of Baku Governorate, however, in 1874, the territory was detached and established as a separate Aresh uezd of the newly established Elizavetpol Governorate in 1868. 

The Aresh uezd was formally abolished by Soviet authorities in 1929, and superseded by the Agdash Rayon, which was established in its place in 1930.

Administrative divisions 
The subcounties (uchastoks) of the Aresh uezd in 1912 were as follows:

Economy 
The population was engaged primarily in agricultural farming and gardening. During summers, they would take the cattle to the mountains and return only in September. Wool production played an important role in the economy of uezd.

Demographics

Russian Empire Census 
The plurality of the population indicated Tatar to be their mother tongue, with significant Armenian and Kyurin (Lezgian) speaking minorities.

Kavkazskiy kalendar 
The statistics indicated Sunni Muslims to be the overwhelming majority of the population of the county with significant Armenian and Shia Muslim minorities:

Notes

References

Bibliography 

Geographic history of Azerbaijan
States and territories established in 1874
1929 disestablishments in the Soviet Union
Uezds of the Soviet Union
Uezds of Elizavetpol Governorate
States and territories disestablished in 1929